Sébastien Combot (born 9 February 1987 in Landerneau) is a French slalom canoeist who has competed at the international level since 2005.

He won five medals at the ICF Canoe Slalom World Championships with two golds (K1: 2007, K1 team: 2014) and three silvers (K1: 2014, K1 team: 2007, 2017). He also won two silver medals in the K1 team event at the European Championships.

Combot finished 8th in the K1 event at the 2016 Summer Olympics in Rio de Janeiro.

He began kayaking after discovering a local artificial whitewater stadium at the age of nine. His wife Laura Mangin also represented France in canoe slalom.

World Cup individual podiums

References

External links
 
 

French male canoeists
Living people
1987 births
Canoeists at the 2016 Summer Olympics
Olympic canoeists of France
Medalists at the ICF Canoe Slalom World Championships